The Diocese of Groningen-Leeuwarden is a suffragan Latin diocese of the Catholic Church in the northern part of the ecclesiastical province of the Metropolitan Roman Catholic Archdiocese of Utrecht (covering all the Netherlands). It encompasses the provinces of Groningen, Friesland and Drenthe, as well as the Noordoostpolder, a part of the province of Flevoland.

The cathedral episcopal seat is the Saint Joseph Cathedral in the city of Groningen, capital of the province of the same name. One former cathedral remains in Catholic use : the Sint-Maartenskerk, dedicated to Saint Martin, also in Groningen, is now Protestant church; the Sint-Vituskerk, dedicated to Saint Vitus, in Leeuwarden (Friesland province, most of Dutch Frisia) is only rarely frequented by a small community of faithful from an old orphanage.

History 
 Established on 12 May 1559 as Diocese of Groningen / Groningen(sis) (Latin), on territories split off from the then Diocese of Utrecht and Diocese of Munster (Germany).
 Suppressed in 1600.
 The diocese was re-erected on 2 February 1956 as the Diocese of Groningen/ Groningen(sis) (Latin), on territories split off from its Metropolitan, the Archdiocese of Utrecht, and from the Diocese of Haarlem (Holland).
 Renamed on 4 February 2006 as Diocese of Groningen–Leeuwarden (Nederlands) / Groninga–Leeuwarden (Curiate Italian) / Groningen(sis) et Leovardien(sis) (Latin adjective), albeit it without a co-cathedral.

Statistics and extent 
As per 2014, it pastorally served 110,000 Catholics (5.7% of 1,923,000 total) on 8,585 km2 in 81 parishes with 36 priests (30 diocesan, 6 religious), 3 deacons, 18 lay religious (7 brothers, 11 sisters) and 9 seminarians.
As per the most recent data available, the number of churchgoers in 2005 was 12,435 or 0.7% of the total population.

Episcopal ordinaries
(Roman Rite)

Suffragan Bishops of Groningen
 Pieter Antoon Nierman (1956–1969)
  (1969–1999)
 Wim Eijk (1999–2007), appointed Archbishop of Utrecht (elevated to Cardinal in 2012)
 Gerard de Korte (2008–2016), appointed Bishop of ’s-Hertogenbosch
 Cornelis van den Hout (2017–present)

See also 
 Catholic Church in the Netherlands

References

Sources and external links 
  
 GCatholic.org - data for all sections

Groningen-Leeuwarden
Groningen-Leeuwarden
Christian organizations established in 1956
Culture of Drenthe
Culture of Flevoland
Culture of Friesland
Culture of Groningen (province)
Groningen (city)
Noordoostpolder
Urk